ABC Classic 2 is an Australian classical music internet radio station available internationally online. It is operated by the ABC Classic team at the Australian Broadcasting Corporation (ABC).

History
ABC Classic 2, a music-only talk-free streaming station, was established in June 2014. ABC Classic 2 is managed and programmed by the ABC Classic FM team. ABC Classic 2 broadcasts only via an online stream and is available on the ABC's Android and iOS apps.

The first song played on ABC Classic 2 was Australian composer Nigel Westlake’s Penguin Ballet from his Antarctica Suite, performed by the Tasmanian Symphony Orchestra and Timothy Kain.

Programming
Classic 2 specialises in streaming popular styles of classical music. The music on Classic 2 is performed exclusively by leading Australian orchestras, ensembles and soloists.  No opera or vocal works are included in the playlist. During daytime and evenings Classic 2 typically broadcasts short excerpts from the classical repertoire, for example single movements from full symphonies.

Australian performance

ABC Classic 2 broadcasts exclusively Australian artists performing classical music.

Overnights
Between midnight and 06:00, longer works are included, and Classic 2 programming is also broadcast as ABC Classic FM's "overnight" program.

References

External links 

 

Australian radio networks
Classical music radio stations in Australia
Australian Broadcasting Corporation radio stations
Public radio in Australia